The 2009 Northeast Conference baseball tournament began on May 21 and ended on May 23, 2009, at New Britain Stadium in New Britain, Connecticut.  The league's top four teams competed in the double elimination tournament.  Fourth-seeded  won their fourth tournament championship and earned the Northeast Conference's automatic bid to the 2009 NCAA Division I baseball tournament.

Seeding and format
The top four finishers were seeded one through four based on conference regular-season winning percentage.

Bracket

All-Tournament Team
The following players were named to the All-Tournament Team.

Most Valuable Player
Chris Collazo was named Tournament Most Valuable Player.  Collazo was a second baseman for Monmouth who  hit .600 (9-for-15) and drove in six runs over the three games.

References

Tournament
Northeast Conference Baseball Tournament
Northeast Conference baseball tournament
Northeast Conference baseball tournament